The following is a list and analysis of imports into the United States for 2020 and 2019 in millions of United States dollars. The United States imported $2,810.6 billion worth of goods and services in 2020, down $294.5 billion from 2019. This consisted of $2,350.6 billion worth of goods and $460.1 billion worth of services. The goods and services deficit was $678.7 billion in 2020, up $101.9 billion from $576.9 billion in 2019. The 2020 increase in the goods and services deficit reflected an increase in the goods deficit of $51.5 billion, or 6.0%, to $915.8 billion and a decrease in the services surplus of $50.4 billion, or 17.5%, to $237.1 billion. As a percentage of U.S. gross domestic product, the goods and services deficit was 3.2% in 2020, up from 2.7% in 2019. The large decline in imports in 2020 has been attributed to the effects of COVID-19 pandemic. Some key highlights of the 2020 data are:

 Imports of goods decreased $166.2 billion to $2,350.6 billion in 2020.
 Automotive vehicles, parts, and engines decreased $65.2 billion. 
 Passenger cars decreased $33.4 billion. 
 Automotive parts and accessories decreased $15.3 billion. 
 Trucks, buses, and special purpose vehicles decreased $10.8 billion. 
 Industrial supplies and materials decreased $42.3 billion. 
 Crude oil decreased $50.2 billion. 
 Other petroleum products decreased $16.5 billion. 
 Non-Monetary gold increased $25.1 billion. 
 Finished metal shapes increased $23.7 billion. 
 Capital goods decreased $31.2 billion. 
 Civilian aircraft engines decreased $11.1 billion. 
 Other industrial machinery decreased $6.7 billion. 
 Civilian aircraft parts decreased $6.7 billion. 
 Computers increased $11.5 billion. 
 Imports of services decreased $128.3 billion to $460.1 billion in 2020.
 Travel decreased $95.3 billion. 
 Transport decreased $35.9 billion.

2015 list

See also
List of exports of the United States
List of the largest trading partners of the United States
Value added tax trade criticism

References

Foreign trade of the United States
Trading partners